Ian Morley Berry (born 3 November 1951) is an Australian Liberal National politician who was the member of the Legislative Assembly of Queensland for Ipswich from 2012 to 2015.

Background
Berry was born in Brisbane and grew up in Sherwood before moving to Ipswich in the early 1980s.

A solicitor by profession and former president of the Queensland Law Society, Berry has a long history of community service which has included serving as a trustee of Ipswich Girls Grammar School, as president of the Booval Cricket Club, as a member of the Ipswich Legal Aid Review Committee and as a patron of the Musketeers Sports Club.

Berry has also coached junior cricket and hockey teams and is a keen athlete, competing in numerous half marathons and fun runs.

References

1951 births
Living people
Liberal National Party of Queensland politicians
Members of the Queensland Legislative Assembly
21st-century Australian politicians